Stephen Sonnenberg (born 1940 in Brooklyn, New York), has served as the interim associate chair for education and is professor in the Department of Psychiatry and Behavioral Sciences and a courtesy professor in the Department of Medical Education and the Department of Population Health at UT Austin's Dell Medical School.He is also the Paul Woodruff Professor for Excellence in Undergraduate Studies in the School of Undergraduate Studies at the University of Texas at Austin.

Educated at Princeton University, He received his medical degree at Albert Einstein College of Medicine. He interned in the Department of Internal Medicine at the University of Wisconsin, Madison, did his Psychiatry Residency at Einstein College of Medicine, and trained as a researcher at the National Institute of Mental Health. He then trained as a psychoanalyst at the Baltimore-DC Institute for Psychoanalysis. He has practiced medicine since 1965, and has been educating undergraduate students for seventeen years in medical humanities and medical ethics. His work in academia focuses on medical and undergraduate education, medical ethics and humanities, and war and violence.

In addition to his appointments at Dell Medical School and the School of Undergraduate Studies, Sonnenberg has served as Fellow of the Trice Professorship and Fellow of the Frank M. and Dorothy H. Conklin Endowment for Medical Ethics, both in UT Austin's College of Liberal Arts Plan II Honors Program. 

In 2017, the National Endowment for the Humanities awarded Sonnenberg a grant to create an undergraduate medical humanities program at UT Austin, “Patients, Practitioners, and Cultures of Care (PPCC).” He currently chairs the Faculty Panel governing the program.

Books 

 Sonnenberg, Stephen M., Blank, Arthur S, and Talbott, John A. The Trauma of War: Stress and Recovery in Viet Nam Veterans. Washington, D.C.: American Psychiatric Press, 1985.  
 Ursano, Robert J., Sonnenberg, Stephen M., and Lazar, Susan G. Concise Guide to Psychodynamic Psychotherapy: Principles and Techniques of Brief, Intermittent, and Long-Term Psychodynamic Psychotherapy. American Psychiatric Publishing Inc, 2004

References 

Living people
Writers from Brooklyn
1940 births
University of Texas at Austin faculty
Princeton University alumni
Albert Einstein College of Medicine alumni
University of Wisconsin–Madison faculty
Psychoanalysts